"And You and I" is the second track from the album Close to the Edge by the English progressive rock band Yes. The song is just over ten minutes in length and consists of four movements. The first and second parts of the song were released as a single edit and reached number 42 on the Billboard Hot 100.

Introducing the song live in 1972, lead vocalist Jon Anderson said Yes called it "The Protest Song" when they were making the Close to the Edge album. Paul Stump's 1997 History of Progressive Rock called the song "a tour de force of atmosphere, contrasting opaline twelve-string against Rick Wakeman's cavernous Mellotron, light and shade divided across the four sections with pleasing architectural skill".

Parts

I. Cord of Life
The song opens with Steve Howe on 12-string acoustic guitar, his voice heard at the beginning of the track, then playing mostly natural guitar harmonics before introducing the opening guitar theme. Following a brief percussive part and a bright ping of a triangle, a lush strumming part in 3/4 time with a simple three chord chord progression in the key of D major begins. Then, the Minimoog enters introducing a short, haunting melody. The vocals begin at about 1:40. The line "All complete in the sight of seeds of life with you" is sung, which is repeated throughout the song. At about 2:50, there are several distinct changes: a key change to an ambiguous tonality centering on Bb (the chords are Bb, C, Am, and Em), a new vocal melody in 4/4 time ("Coins and crosses") accompanied by a second vocal track of Anderson singing a lower harmony with himself, plus Chris Squire and Steve Howe providing a rhythmically faster counter-melody with different, contrasting lyrics, and with their voices distorted through a rotating Leslie speaker to contrast with Anderson's lead melody.  This section modulates to the key of A major in time for the first statement of the main lyrical theme of the song "And you and I climb over the sea to the valley".  A strummed G6/9 chord by Howe followed by a sustained harmonized vocal chord segues into the next section.

II. Eclipse
"Eclipse" is the slowest part of the song based on a stately and deliberate melody which was actually composed by drummer Bill Bruford. It is led by Rick Wakeman's Mellotron and Minimoog, with a thematic quote from "Cord of Life" played by Steve Howe on a Sho-Bud Pro1 pedal steel guitar with distortion and a heavy delay effect. After a seamless shift to 3/4 time Wakeman comes in with a new organ theme, followed by Anderson with a soaring, high register vocal melody.  The lyrics are all from the first stanza of "Cord of Life" but applied to the new vocal melody and the slow, stately tempo. In this section, the chords are mainly derived first from the key of E major and the E Mixolydian mode (E major and D major), followed again by the key of E major during the organ solo and vocal section before ending roughly in the key of G major (with a few chords borrowed from E major). It ends with the opening 12-string acoustic guitar part from "Cord Of Life" before seguing into "The Preacher, the Teacher".

III. The Preacher, The Teacher
This section begins with Howe introducing a new musical theme in 3/4 meter — an intricate folk-influenced polyphonic guitar part featuring a melody on the low strings punctuated by strummed chords on the off beats. Wakeman enters with a Mini-moog line, a variation of sorts to the opening "Cord Of Life" Minimoog melody. The melody and lyrical structure is very similar to that of "Cord of Life", with some variations, including a brief bass interlude by Chris Squire, and a synthesizer solo by Rick Wakeman (another variation on the "Cord Of Life" theme, this time in a minor key). The last stanza again consists of lines from "Cord of Life", now sung  at a different tempo and against primarily minor chords. At 8:34 there is a reprise of the previous 3/4 instrumental section of "Eclipse", which lasts until approximately 9:12. The section ends with a cadenza-like orchestral statement, on Mellotron and Minimoog, reminiscent of neo-Wagnerian compositions by Richard Strauss or Anton Bruckner.

IV. Apocalypse
"Apocalypse" is the shortest piece of the song, clocking in at about 45 seconds in length.  It is in 3/4 time, in the key of E major and musically and lyrically derived from the final part of "Cord Of Life". Lyrically it consists only of four lines, accompanied only by Howe's guitars, acoustic and steel.

Reception
Cash Box described it as a "perfect example" of progressive rock, "blending four part vocal harmony with expert musicianship."

Personnel 
Jon Anderson – lead vocals
Steve Howe – acoustic, electric, & pedal steel guitars, backing vocals
Chris Squire – bass guitar, backing vocals
Rick Wakeman – Mellotron, Minimoog, Hammond organ
Bill Bruford – drums, percussion

Charts

References

1972 songs
Yes (band) songs
Songs written by Chris Squire
Song recordings produced by Eddy Offord
Songs written by Jon Anderson
Songs written by Steve Howe (musician)
Songs written by Bill Bruford